Warner Sunset Records was an American record label established in 1996 by Warner Music Group to release soundtrack albums of Warner Bros. films. The label closed in 2010 after 14 years and was replaced by WaterTower Music that year.

Discography

References 

Record labels established in 1996
Record labels disestablished in 2010
Defunct record labels of the United States
Soundtrack record labels